The Szczecin Voivodeship was a voivodeship (province) of the Polish People's Republic from 1975 to 1989, and the Third Republic of Poland from 1989 to 1998. Its capital was Szczecin, and it was centered on the western Farther Pomerania. It was established on 1 June 1975, from the part of the Szczecin Voivodeship, and existed until 31 December 1998, when it was incorporated into then-established West Pomeranian Voivodeship.

History 
The Szczecin Voivodeship was established on 1 June 1975, as part of the administrative reform, and was one of the voivodeships (provinces) of the Polish People's Republic. It was formed from the part of the territory of the Szczecin Voivodeship. Its capital was located in the city of Szczecin. In 1975, it was inhabited by 853 700 people. It bordered the Koszalin Voivodeship to the east, the Gorzów Voivodeship to the south, the East Germany to the west, which in 1990, was replaced by Germany, and the Baltic Sea to the north.

On 9 December 1989, the Polish People's Republic was replaced by the Third Republic of Poland. In 1997, the voivodeship had a population of 995 100, and in 1998, it had an area of 9982 km². It existed until 31 December 1998, when it was incorporated into then-established West Pomeranian Voivodeship.

Subdivisions 

In 1997, the voivodeship was divided into 54 gminas (municipalities), including 3 urban municipalities, 28 urban-rural municipalities, and 31 rural municipalities. It had 31 towns and cities.

From 1990 to 1998, it was additionally divided into seven district offices, each comprising several municipalities.

Demographics

Population

Settlements 
In 1997, the voivodeship had 31 cities and towns. In 1998, the biggest cities and towns by population were:
 Szczecin (416 988);
 Stargard Szczeciński (73 753);
 Świnoujście (43 570);
 Police (35 100);
 Goleniów (22 621);
 Gryfino (22 435);
 Gryfice (18 037);
 Nowogard (17 309);
 Pyrzyce (13 247);
 Łobez (10 961);
 Trzebiatów (10 316).

Leaders 
The leader of the administrative division was the voivode. Those were:
 1975–1980: Jerzy Kuczyński
 1980: Henryk Kanicki
 1980–1982: Tadeusz Waluszkiewicz
 1982–1990: Stanisław Malec
 1990–1997: Marek Tałasiewicz
 1997–1998: Władysław Lisewski

Citations

Notes

References 

History of Pomerania
Voivodeship, Szczecin, 1975-1998
Former voivodeships of Poland (1975–1998)
States and territories established in 1975
States and territories disestablished in 1998
1975 establishments in Poland
1998 disestablishments in Poland